Rhizophora stylosa, the spotted mangrove, red mangrove, small stilted mangrove or stilt-root mangrove, is a tree in the family Rhizophoraceae. The specific epithet  is from the Latin meaning "stylus form", referring to the flower.

Description
The bark is dark brown to black.

Distribution and habitat
Rhizophora stylosa grows naturally in Japan, China, Taiwan, Cambodia, Vietnam, Malesia, Australia (New South Wales and Queensland) and many areas of the Pacific. Its habitat is sandy beaches and coral terraces on seashores.

References

External links

stylosa
Trees of Japan
Trees of Taiwan
Trees of China
Trees of Cambodia
Trees of Vietnam
Flora of Malesia
Flora of Queensland
Flora of New South Wales
Flora of the Pacific
Plants described in 1854
Central Indo-Pacific flora